The Struggle for the American Curriculum, 1893–1958, is a book written by historian of education Herbert Kliebard and published by Routledge & Kegan Paul in 1986.

Bibliography

External links 

 

1986 non-fiction books
English-language books
Routledge books
History books about education
History books about the United States